Timo Sakari Puustinen (born 25 October 1979) is a Finnish film director, screenwriter, and film producer.

He directed, wrote and produced the 2005 horror film Aika tappaa. Now he is directing Sanansaattaja movie.

References

External links
 

1979 births
Living people
Finnish film directors
Finnish screenwriters
Finnish film producers
Male screenwriters